Taylor Danielle Vancil (born May 18, 1991) is a retired American professional women's soccer player who was a goalkeeper for Chicago Red Stars in the National Women's Soccer League.

Career

Chicago Red Stars
On January 18, 2013, Vancil was drafted in the 3rd Round of the 2013 NWSL College Draft by the Chicago Red Stars. Vancil then made her debut for the Red Stars on May 24, 2013, against the Western New York Flash in which she started and played the full 90 minutes as the Red Stars lost the match 2–1.

Vancil announced her retirement from professional soccer in March 2015.

International
Vancil was the #1 goalkeeper for the United States U17s during the 2008 FIFA U-17 Women's World Cup in which she led the United States to the Final where they lost to North Korea 2–1. After the tournament she was awarded the golden gloves award.

References

External links 
 Profile at Chicago Red Stars

1991 births
Living people
National Women's Soccer League players
Women's association football goalkeepers
American women's soccer players
Chicago Red Stars players
Place of birth missing (living people)
Florida State Seminoles women's soccer players
Louisville Cardinals women's soccer players
Chicago Red Stars draft picks
People from Youngsville, North Carolina
Women's Premier Soccer League players